Lydia Kang (born October 4, 1971) is an American author and internal medicine physician, best known for her adult historical novel Opium and Absinthe: A Novel and her medical nonfiction book Quackery: A Brief History of the Worst Ways to Cure Everything, co-written with Nate Pedersen.

Life and education 
Lydia Kang was born in Baltimore, Maryland. She graduated from Roland Park Country School in 1989 and received her BA from Columbia University. She was a research assistant at the Columbia University Department of Biology during her undergraduate years and in graduate school. She received her MD from New York University Grossman School of Medicine in 1998. After completing a primary care internal medicine residency at New York University's Langone Department of Medicine, she served as chief resident from 2001 to 2002 before staying on as an attending physician at Bellevue Hospital. In 2006, she moved to Omaha, Nebraska with her family and is an assistant professor in the Division of General Internal Medicine at the University of Nebraska Medical Center. She is of Korean descent.

Career 
In 2009, she joined the writing workshop The Seven Doctors Project at the University of Nebraska Medical Center. After writing two novels, she sold her third, a young adult science fiction novel, Control, to Penguin Random House in 2011 which subsequently released in 2013. The sequel, Catalyst, was published in 2015. In 2017, she released three more books, A Beautiful Poison, Quackery: A Brief History of the Worst Ways to Cure Everything (co-written with Nate Pedersen), and The November Girl. The November Girl won a 2018 Nebraska Best Book Award for Young Adult Literature. Quackery was a Science Friday Best Science Book of 2017. Her young adult novel, Toxic, was published in 2018 and was a YARWA Athena Award winner for speculative fiction and a Junior Library Guild selection. She also published three more adult historical fiction novels including The Impossible Girl in 2018, Opium and Absinthe in 2020, and The Half-Life of Ruby Fielding in 2022. Her second co-written nonfiction book, Patient Zero: A Curious History of the World's Worst Disease, was published in 2021 and received a starred review from Publishers Weekly. Her novel, Patient Zero: A Curious History of the World's Worst Diseases, co-authored with Nate Pedersen, is the 2022 winner of the Nebraska Book Award in the NonFiction Popular History category.

Her writing is included in the young adult anthology, Color Outside the Lines: Stories about Love. Her short story, Right-Hand Man, is included in the 2020 anthology From a Certain Point of View: The Empire Strikes Back, which describes the critical scene in The Empire Strikes Back in which 2-1B attached Luke Skywalker's prosthetic hand. In 2022, StarWars.com announced the addition of Kang to their Phase II multimedia project for the novel, Cataclysm.

She has frequently helped other writers with medical accuracy in their fiction. She has also published poetry and essays in JAMA, The Canadian Medical Association Journal, Flatwater Free Press, Journal of General Internal Medicine, The Annals of Internal Medicine, Great Weather for Media, and the Linden Review.

Works 

Young Adult Novels
 Control (Dial Books, Penguin Random House, 2013)
 Catalyst (Kathy Dawson Books, Penguin Random House, 2013)
 The November Girl (Entangled Publishing, 2017)
 Toxic (Entangled Publishing, 2018)

Short Stories
 Yuna and the Wall in Color Outside the Lines: Stories about Love (Soho Press, 2019)
 The Right-Hand Man in Star Wars: From a Certain Point of View: The Empire Strikes Back (Random House Worlds, 2020)

Adult Novels
 A Beautiful Poison (Lake Union Publishing, 2017)
 The Impossible Girl (Lake Union Publishing, 2018)
 Opium and Absinthe: A Novel (Lake Union Publishing, 2020)
 The Half-Life of Ruby Fielding (Lake Union Publishing, 2022)
 Star Wars: Cataclysm (Del Rey Books, forthcoming)

Adult Nonfiction
 Quackery: A Brief History of the Worst Ways to Cure Everything (Workman Publishing, 2017)
 Patient Zero (Workman Publishing, 2022)

References 

Living people
1971 births
American writers
American physicians